Chris Hamilton may refer to:
 Chris Hamilton (cyclist) (born 1995), Australia road racing cyclist
 Chris Hamilton (footballer, born 1987), Scottish footballer
 Chris Hamilton (footballer, born 2001), Scottish footballer for Hearts
 Chris Hamilton (athlete), American cross-country runner